Verticordia albida is a flowering plant in the myrtle family, Myrtaceae and is endemic to the south-west of Western Australia. It is a shrub with one main stem with many branches and spike-like groups of scented, white feathery flowers with a pink centre.

Description

Flowering time is from November to January.

Taxonomy and naming
Verticordia albida was first formally described by Alex George in 1991 from specimens collected near Three Springs and the description was published in Nuytsia. The specific epithet (albida) is from the Latin albidus (whitish), in reference to the sepals and petals".

George placed this species in subgenus Eperephes, section Pennuligera along with V. comosa, V. lepidophylla, V. chrysostachys, V. dichroma, V. x eurardyensis, V. muelleriana, V. argentea, V. aereiflora, V. fragrans, V. venusta, V. forrestii, V. serotina, V. oculata, V. etheliana and V. grandis.

Distribution and habitat
This verticordia grows in sand near or over gravel, often with other verticordias in woodland or shrubland in a small area near Three Springs in the Avon Wheatbelt and Geraldton Sandplains biogeographic regions.

Conservation
Verticordia albida is classified as "Threatened Flora (Declared Rare Flora — Extant)" by the Western Australian Government Department of Parks and Wildlife and an Interim Recovery Plan has been prepared. It has also been listed as "Endangered" (EN) under the Australian Government Environment Protection and Biodiversity Conservation Act 1999 (EPBC Act).

Use in horticulture
It is difficult to propagate this verticordia from cuttings but it has been successfully grafted onto Chamelaucium uncinatum rootstock. Tissue culture has also been used successfully at Kings Park, Western Australia.

References

albida
Rosids of Western Australia
Eudicots of Western Australia
Plants described in 1991